Tenughat Thermal Power Station is a coal-based thermal power plant located at Lalpania in Bokaro district in the Indian state of Jharkhand. The power plant is owned by Jharkhand State owned Tenughat Vidyut Nigam Limited.

Capacity
It has an installed capacity of 420 MW (2x210 MW).

References

Coal-fired power stations in Jharkhand
Bokaro district
Year of establishment missing